Ettore Ovazza (21 March 1892 – 11 October 1943) was an Italian Jewish banker. He was an early financer of Benito Mussolini, of whom he was a personal friend, and Italian fascism, which he supported until the Italian racial laws of 1938. He founded the journal La nostra bandiera. Believing that his position would be restored after the war, Ovazza stayed on after the Germans marched into Italy. Together with his wife and children, shortly after the Fall of Fascism and Mussolini's government during World War II, he was executed near the Swiss border by SS troops in 1943.

Early life and family 
One of three brothers, he was born in Turin to the Ovazza family, a wealthy and influential Jewish banking family based in Turin. They were one of the leading banking families in Italy. His father and his three brothers voluntarily enlisted to fight in World War I. While following Jewish traditions, such as celebrating Passover, the family was well integrated into Italian high society. His father served as the leader of the Turinese Jewish community.

World War I 
Ovazza studied law at university and then travelled to Germany with a view to a diplomatic career. At the outbreak of the Great War in 1914, he volunteered and trained as an officer, only to suffer the humiliating defeat in the Battle of Caporetto. His patriotic letters from the front were published in 1928 and received general praise. After the war, the city of Turin was badly affected by the turmoil of the Biennio Rosso (Two Red Years) with repeated strikes, lockouts and violent demonstrations. The Ovazza family were alarmed by these developments.

Between war years 
Ovazza was a committed fascist from the start. He took part in the March on Rome in October 1922; in 1929, he was invited to meet Benito Mussolini as a part of a delegation of Jewish war veterans. He later described the encounter thusly: "On hearing my affirmation of the unshakeable loyalty of Italian Jews to the Fatherland, His Excellency Mussolini looks me straight in the eye and says with a voice that penetrates straight to my heart: 'I have never doubted it'.  When Il Duce bids us farewell with a Roman salute, I feel an urge to embrace him, as a fascist, as an Italian, but I can't; and approaching him at his desk I say: 'Excellency, I would like to shake your hand'. It is not a fascist gesture, but it is a cry from the heart ... Such is The Man that Providence has given to Italy."

In the 1920s and 1930s, the National Fascist Party attitudes to the Jewish population began to change as Adolf Hitler came to power in Germany. Although Mussolini rejected Nazi racial theories, they influenced some leading Fascists in Italy. In 1934, several Jews were arrested in Turin for smuggling in anti-fascist literature. Ovazza reacted by doubling his efforts to support the Fascist Italy regime. He founded the newspaper La nostra bandiera (Our Flag), reminding Italians of the Jewish sacrifice for Italy in the Great War. Taking a leading role in the Jewish community in Turin, Ovazza ensured that all the key positions were held by Fascist supporters. When Mussolini started the invasion of Abyssinia and the Second Italo-Ethiopian War, he immediately volunteered for service, an offer that was turned down probably due to his age, being 43. Despite the beginnings of antisemitism, Ovazza was still being rewarded for his patriotism. In 1935, he was honoured for his contribution to the colony of Libya, and in the following year he was invited at the honour guard at the tomb of the royal family in Superga.

World War II 
In 1938, when the Italian racial laws, a series of antisemitic laws, were passed, the Ovazza family were hit hard. Jews were no longer allowed to marry Aryan Italians, to send their children to state schools, to employ Italian servants, or be in the army. Much more damaging were the rules that stated they could not employ over 100 people, or own valuable land or buildings. In 1939, Jews were banned from all skilled jobs; shops and cafés displayed signs saying that Jews were no longer welcome. Jewish organizations were disbanded and many Jews converted to Catholicism or emigrated abroad. This put an end to the Ovazza business and banking operations. Ovazza was expelled from the Fascist party and his brother from the military.

Ovazza's two brothers left the country and advised him to do the same; he was reluctant to leave the country, hoping that Mussolini would alter his views. He wrote an anguished letter to Mussolini in which he expressed his pain. He stated: "Was it all a dream we nurtured? I can't believe it. I cannot consider changing religion, because this would be a betrayal – and we are fascists. And so? I turn to You – DUCE – so that in this period, so important for our revolution, you do not exclude that healthy Italian part from the destiny of our Nation."

Death 
After the surrender of Italy in 1943, Ovazza and his family were intercepted and shot by the SS, close to the Swiss border as part of the Lake Maggiore massacres. Their bodies were burned in boiler of the schools of Intra, Italy.

Legacy 
His nephew, Alain Elkann, wrote a fictionalized version of his life. His great-grand-nephew is John Elkann.

Works 
 E. Ovazza, Il diritto internazionale e la conflagrazione bellica. La proprietà privata. Turin: Tipografia Baravalle e Falconieri, 1915.
 L. Perigozzo, O bionda creatura (canto e piano), text of E. Ovazza. Turin: Perosino, 1915.
 E. Ovazza, L'uomo e i fantocci. Verità in tre momenti. Milan: Modernissima, 1921.
 E. Ovazza, Ghirlande (liriche). Milano: Modernissima, 1922.
 E. Ovazza, In margine alla storia. Riflessi della guerra e del dopoguerra (1914-1924), preface by V. Buronzo. Turin: Casanova, 1925.
 L. Perigozzo, Quattro impressioni, text of E. Ovazza. Bologna: Bongiovanni, 1925.
 E. Ovazza, Diario per mio figlio. Turin: Sten, 1928.
 E. Ovazza, Lettere dal campo (1917-1919), with explanatory notes, preface by D.M. Tuninetti. Turin: Casanova, 1932.
 E. Ovazza, Politica fascista. Turin: Sten, 1933.
 E. Ovazza, Sionismo bifronte. Rome: Pinciana, 1935.
 E. Ovazza, L'Inghilterra e il mandato in Palestina, preface by A. Pozzi, Rome: Pinciana, 1936.
 E. Ovazza, Sita (poemetto indiano), woodcut by B. Bramanti. Florence: Rinascimento del Libro, 1937.
 E. Ovazza, Il problema ebraico. Risposta a Paolo Orano. Rome: Pinciana, 1938.
 E. Ovazza, Guerra senza sangue (Da Versaglia a Monaco). Rome: Pinciana, 1939.

References

Bibliography 
 
 
 G. Valabrega, "Prima notizie su "La Nostra Bandiera'". in Id., Ebrei, fascismo, sionismo. Urbino: Argalia, 1974, pp. 41–57.
 P. Spagnolo, "Aspetti della questione ebraica nell'Italia fascista. Il gruppo de 'La Nostra Bandiera' (1935-1938)". Annali del Dipartimento di scienze storiche e sociali. V, 1986–87, pp. 127–145.
 A. Stille, Uno su mille. Cinque famiglie ebraiche durante il fascismo. Milan: Mondadori, 1991.
 L. Klinkhammer, Stragi naziste in Italia. La guerra contro i civili (1943-1944). Rome: Donzelli, 1997.
 L. Ventura, Ebrei con il duce. "La Nostra Bandiera", 1934-1938. Turin: Zamorani, 2002.
 E. Holpfer, "L'azione penale contro i crimini in Austria. Il caso di Gottfried Meir, una SS austriaca in Italia". La Rassegna Mensile di Israel, LXIX, 2003, pp. 619–634.
 G. S. Rossi, La destra e gli ebrei. Una storia italiana. Soveria Mannelli: Rubbettino, 2003.
 M. Angeletti, Ettore Ovazza (1892-1943), un ebreo ad oltranza. Gli scritti letterari di Ettore Ovazza. Trento: University of Trento, 2005.
 P. Lazzarotto, F. Presbitero, Sembra facile chiamarsi Ovazza. Storia di una famiglia ebraica nel racconto dei protagonisti. Milan: Edizioni Biografiche, 2009.
 Vincenzo Pinto, "Fedelissimi cittadini della Patria che è Madre comune. Il fascismo estetico e sentimentale di Ettore Ovazza (1892-1943)". Nuova Storia Contemporanea, XV, 5, 2011, pp. 51–72.

External links 
 Ettore Ovazza e Nella Sacerdote Ovazza at CDEC 
 Ettore Ovazza, Riccardo Ovazza ed Elena Ovazza at CDEC 
 Fascismo e questione ebraica [On Fascism and Jews, literally 'Fascism and the Jewish question'] at Italian Wikipedia 
 I grandi fascisti ebrei at Jacopobarbarito 
 The Jewish Fascist at Toritto 
 I nomi della Shoah italiana: scheda di Ettore Ovazza at Nomi della Shoah 
 La profetica denuncia dei fascisti ebrei contro il sionismo by Italian historians of fascism at Biblioteca Fascista de ilCovo 
 Quest. Issues in Contemporary Jewish History. Journal of the Fondazione CDEC at  
 La Shoah in Italia. Temi, problemi, storiografia at Novecento.org 
 Stories Out Of The Silence at Newsweek 
 L'uomo e i fantocci at Internet Archive 
 I volti della memoria. Le fotografie degli ebrei deportati dall'Italia at CDEC 

1892 births
1943 deaths
Anti-Zionist Jews
Businesspeople from Turin
Italian bankers
Italian fascists
Italian Jews who died in the Holocaust
Jewish bankers
Jewish fascists